Puppet Combo is an American independent video game development studio founded by Benedetto "Ben" Cocuzza in 2012 as Pig Farmer Games and based in Brooklyn. Puppet Combo's games, such as Nun Massacre (2018) and the critically acclaimed Murder House (2020), are mostly survival horror games developed solely by Cocuzza and modeled after early PlayStation games and VHS. They are also frequently inspired by 1980s horror films, specifically grindhouse and slasher films. Puppet Combo primarily releases their games through Patreon and Itch.io. Cocuzza launched Torture Star Video, a video game publisher for lo-fi horror games, in 2021.

History

Developing
Puppet Combo was founded in 2012 by Benedetto "Ben" Cocuzza in Brooklyn as Pig Farmer Games. Cocuzza began developing games in 2000 and, inspired by his desire to adapt a slasher film into a video game, he later learned how to develop survival horror games. In 2012, Pig Farmer Games began developing Sanitarium Massacre, a stealth horror game in which the player controls a serial killer named Neokalus Burr who goes on a killing spree throughout a sanitarium in 1978, with a soundtrack produced by Cocuzza in Ableton Live. It was scheduled to be released the following year, but it was later scrapped, and assets from it were used to make Halloween, which Cocuzza developed using software taken from a Friday the 13th fangame made by Microstuff Studios. Halloween was a survival horror game heavily inspired by the 1978 film of the same name and released as freeware in October 2013. The game was briefly taken down due to copyright infringement and re-released as Babysitter Bloodbath in December 2013. It focuses on a teenage girl named Sarah who is chased by a serial killer while babysitting; it uses tank controls and can be viewed in third-person or first-person. 

The low poly, grindhouse-influenced slasher game Power Drill Massacre was developed by Puppet Combo using Unity and released for PC in 2015.
 It has four texture packs, and its plot, which was inspired by the 1974 film The Texas Chain Saw Massacre, focuses on a young woman who goes into an abandoned factory in the woods, where she is chased by a murderer. Luke Winkie of Vulture called the game "a pure slasher pastiche that somehow manages to squeeze out the most intense jump scares on the market", while Kill Screen wrote that it was "capable of a genuine and sudden fright" and "a thrill that not many horror games are able to reach". Puppet Combo launched a Patreon account in 2017 through which to release their games. 

In 2018, Puppet Combo developed and released Nun Massacre, a 32-bit stealth survival horror game in which the protagonist, Mrs. McDonnell, must escape from a run-down Catholic boarding school and avoid a knife-wielding killer nun, all while figuring out the mystery of the school. Its lo-fi graphics were inspired by cathode-ray tube televisions, PlayStation games, and VHS tracking. Nun Massacre was released for PlayStation 4, PlayStation 5, Nintendo Switch, and iOS in March 2022, when a difficulty option was added to the game. The game received mostly positive reviews from critics. Also in 2018, Feed Me, Billy!, a psychological horror game about a serial killer who must feed the hole in his closet with the bodies of his victims, was released by Puppet Combo through Patreon. Vices Michael Siebert deemed its gameplay "psychologically disturbed", "simple", and "repetitive", with mechanics that "belie a dreary and upsetting world", and Lewis Gordon of The Verge called it "gruesome pulp horror". In April 2019, Puppet Combo released The Glass Staircase on PC through Itch.io. It is a survival horror game about a group of young women in the early 1900s who are kept in a mysterious treatment facility and was inspired by PlayStation 2 games and Italian horror films.

The survival horror game Murder House was developed by Puppet Combo and released on PC through Steam in 2020. Like many of Puppet Combo's games, it takes inspiration from 1980s horror films, early PlayStation games, and VHS, and follows a news crew as they are hunted down in an abandoned home by the Easter Ripper, a serial killer who wears a rabbit costume and was thought to be dead after being executed three years prior. The game uses tank controls and is viewed from a third-person perspective, though players can choose to play in first-person, and it has a horror synth soundtrack and intentionally low quality sound mixing. Kotakus Mike Fahey praised Murder House as "old-school nightmare fuel", stating that its "antediluvian 3D visuals" give it a "classic creepy vibe that's almost timeless", while Bloody Disgusting called it "seemingly the gory survival horror crescendo Cucuzza has been building towards" and "such a memorable survival horror ride". The A.V. Clubs Alexander Chatziioannou described Murder House as one of "the scariest, most imaginative horror games of 2021"; Kelsey Raynor of VG247 listed Murder House as one of the best horror games of all time in 2021. The game also received widespread acclaim from Steam users. In October 2021, it was released for PlayStation 4, Xbox One, and Nintendo Switch. Its Nintendo Switch icon, a "disturbing" close-up image of the Easter Ripper's face, trended on social media after Puppet Combo refused to change it. 

In December 2021, Puppet Combo released the score attack game Christmas Massacre, in which Larry, a serial killer dressed as Santa Claus, is told by his Christmas tree to kill as many people as possible. On his list of the best horror games of 2021, Neil Bolt of Bloody Disgusting listed Christmas Massacre as an honorable mention. IGNs 2022 list of the best horror games for PC included Puppet Combo's games at number two. Puppet Combo's game Stay Out of the House is set to be released on PC through Steam.

Publishing
Puppet Combo published the 8-bit horror game Tonight It Follows, developed by Jordan King, under the name Puppet Combo Presents, and released the game through their Patreon in June 2019. In 2021, Puppet Combo launched Torture Star Video, a video game publishing company with a focus on lo-fi horror games. Bloodwash, a giallo- and PlayStation-inspired horror game developed by Henry Hoare and Jordan King, was published by Torture Star Video and released in September 2021. The game revolves around Sara, a young woman who goes to a laundromat to do her laundry while a serial killer of pregnant women, dubbed the Womb Ripper, is on the loose. Survival Horror Downloads named Bloodwash the fifth best horror game of 2021. For PC Gamer, Joseph Knoop gave the game a mixed review, praising its characters and settings but writing that it "walks the line between stylish homage and cliché-ridden romp" and contains "often exploitative" and "problematic" tropes.

Games

Games published

References

Indie video game developers
Video game publishers
2012 establishments in the United States
American companies established in 2012
Video game companies of the United States
Video game development companies
Video game companies established in 2012